Acalolepta magnetica is a species of beetle in the family Cerambycidae. It was described by Francis Polkinghorne Pascoe in 1866, originally under the genus Monochamus. It is known from Micronesia, Moluccas and Indonesia.

Subspecies
 Acalolepta magnetica auripilis (Matsushita, 1935)
 Acalolepta magnetica magnetica (Pascoe, 1866)

References

Acalolepta
Beetles described in 1866
Taxa named by Francis Polkinghorne Pascoe